Castra of Boroșneu Mare was a fort in the Roman province of Dacia in the 2nd and 3rd centuries AD. A contemporary settlement was also unearthed at the fort. Its ruins are located in Boroșneu Mare in Romania.

See also
List of castra

Notes

External links

Roman castra from Romania - Google Maps / Earth

Roman Dacia
Archaeological sites in Romania
Roman legionary fortresses in Romania
Ancient history of Transylvania
Historic monuments in Covasna County